Marie of Brabant (13 May 1254 – 12 January 1322) was Queen of France from 1274 until 1285 as the second wife of King Philip III. Born in Leuven, Brabant, she was a daughter of Henry III, Duke of Brabant, and Adelaide of Burgundy.

Queen 

Marie married the widowed Philip III of France on 21 August 1274. His first wife, Isabella of Aragon, had already given birth to three surviving sons: Louis, Philip and Charles.

Philip was under the strong influence of his mother, Margaret of Provence, and his minion, surgeon and chamberlain (Chambellan) Pierre de la Broce. Not being French, Marie stood out at the French court. In 1276, Marie's stepson Louis died under suspicious circumstances. Marie was suspected of ordering him to be poisoned. La Broce, who was also suspected, was imprisoned and later executed for the murder.

Queen dowager 

After the death of Philip III in 1285, Marie lost some of her political influence, and dedicated her life to their three children: Louis (May 1276 – 19 May 1319), Blanche (1278 – 19 March 1305) and Margaret (died in 1318). Her stepson Philip IV was crowned king of France on 6 January 1286 in Reims.

Together with Joan I of Navarre and Blanche of Artois, she negotiated peace in 1294 between England and France with Edmund Crouchback, the younger brother of Edward I of England.

Marie lived through Philip IV's reign and she outlived her children. She died in 1322, aged 67, in the monastery at Les Mureaux, near Meulan, where she had withdrawn to in 1316. Marie was not buried in the royal necropolis of Basilica of Saint-Denis, but in the Cordeliers Convent, in Paris. Destroyed in a fire in 1580, the church was rebuilt in the following years.

See also
 Marie of Brabant (disambiguation)

Notes

Sources

|-

1254 births
1322 deaths
Marie of Brabant
People from Leuven
Marie
13th-century French people
13th-century French women
14th-century French people
14th-century French women